Zhivyye is a rural locality (a village) in Leninskoye Rural Settlement, Kudymkarsky District, Perm Krai, Russia. The population was 45 as of 2010.

Geography 
Zhivyye is located 39 km south of Kudymkar (the district's administrative centre) by road. Buslayeva is the nearest rural locality.

References 

Rural localities in Kudymkarsky District